The Legislative Assembly of Kaliningrad Oblast, formerly the Kaliningrad Oblast Duma until April 2022, is the regional parliament of Kaliningrad Oblast, a federal subject of Russia. A total of 40 deputies are elected for five-year terms.

Elections

2021

Notes

References

Kaliningrad Oblast
Politics of Kaliningrad Oblast